Larry, Lawrence or Laurence Riley may refer to:

 Larry Riley (basketball), director of scouting for the Golden State Warriors
 Larry Riley (actor) (1953–1992), American actor and musician
Larry Riley (animator) from Olive Oyl for President
Laurence Riley from Peter Finch
Lawrence Riley, writer
Lawrence Joseph Riley, U.S. Catholic bishop